Shepherd-Barron is a surname. Notable people with the surname include:

Dorothy Shepherd-Barron (1897–1953), British tennis player
John Shepherd-Barron (born 1925), inventor and developer of the cash machine or ATM
Nicholas Shepherd-Barron (born 1955), mathematician; son of John Shepherd-Barron

Compound surnames
English-language surnames
Surnames of English origin